Amélie Mauresmo was the defending champion, but was forced to retire during her semifinal match against Monica Seles.

Justine Henin-Hardenne won the title by defeating Monica Seles 4–6, 7–6(7–4), 7–5 in the final.

Seeds
The top four seeds received a bye into the second round.

Draw

Finals

Top half

Bottom half

External links
 Main and Qualifying rounds

Singlesa
2003 WTA Tour